Christ among the Doctors is an oil painting by Albrecht Dürer, dating to  1506, now in the Museo Thyssen-Bornemisza, Madrid, Spain. The work dates to Dürer's sojourn in Venice, and was executed (according to the inscription Opus Quinque Dierum, meaning "Made in five days") hastily while he was working at the Feast of the Rosary altarpiece.

According to some sources, it could have been given to painter Giovanni Bellini. In the latter's house it was perhaps seen by Lorenzo Lotto, who used one of the figures in the painting for his Madonna with Child between Sts. Flavian and Onuphrius now in the Borghese Gallery. The subject had been already treated by Dürer in a woodcut of the Life of the Virgin series and in a panel of the Seven Sorrows Polyptych. However, in the Venetian work the German artist adopted a totally new composition, with the characters occupying the whole scene and surrounding the young Jesus, leaving a little room for the black background.

The topic is the Finding in the Temple episode from Jesus' childhood, found in the Gospel of Luke. The character at the left of Jesus is a true caricature, perhaps inspired by one of Leonardo da Vinci's drawings seen by Dürer. The man in the lower left corner has a cartouche on his beret, a custom of the Pharisees.  The one on the opposite side is perhaps a citation of Bellini.

Sources

Paintings by Albrecht Dürer
1506 paintings
Paintings in the Thyssen-Bornemisza Museum
Paintings depicting Jesus
Books in art
Caricature